The Ambassador from New Zealand to Indonesia is New Zealand's foremost diplomatic representative in the Republic of Indonesia, and in charge of New Zealand's diplomatic mission in Indonesia.

The embassy is located in South Jakarta, Indonesia's capital city. New Zealand has maintained a resident ambassador in Indonesia since 1968, and a resident Head of Mission since 1961.

List of heads of mission

Consuls-General to Indonesia
 Duncan McFadyen Rae (1961–1963)

Chargés d'Affaires in Indonesia
 Duncan McFadyen Rae (1963)
 Paul Edmonds (1963–1964)

Ministers in Indonesia
 Reuel Lochore (1964–1966)

Ambassadors to Indonesia
 Bill Challis (1968–1971)
 Basil Bolt (1971–1973)
 Ray Jermyn (1973–1976)
 Roger Peren (1976–1980)
 Richard Nottage (1980–1982)
 Michael Powles (1982–1986)
 Gordon Parkinson (1986–1990)
 Neil Walter (1990–1994)
 Tim Groser (1994–1997)
 Michael Green (1997–2001)
 Christopher Elder (2001–2006)
 Phillip Gibson (2006–2010)
 David Taylor (2010–2014)
 Dr Trevor Matheson (2015–2019)
 Dr Jonathan Austin (2019–2021)
 Kevin Burnett (2021-

References
 .  New Zealand Ministry of Foreign Affairs and Trade Heads of Missions.  Updated 5 November 2021.
 

Indonesia, Ambassadors from New Zealand to
 
New Zealand